BV Cloppenburg Frauen is a German women's football team. It represents BV Cloppenburg.

The team has its origins in Regionalliga side SV Höltinghausen, which was absorbed by Cloppenburg in 2008. Cloppenburg earned promotion to the Second Bundesliga in its second try. In its debut it was second to last in the North group and was scheduled to play the relegation play-off against SV Löchgau, but the tie was cancelled due to the withdrawal of Hamburger SV's farm team and both teams avoided relegation. After playing in the 2. Frauen-Bundesliga for the majority of the 2010s decade, they withdrew their team before the start of the 2020–21 season.

Players

First Team Squad

References

External links

Women's football clubs in Germany
Association football clubs established in 2008
2008 establishments in Germany
Football clubs in Lower Saxony
BV Cloppenburg